Jens is a surname which may refer to:

 Anna Jens (1766–1815), Dutch East Indies coffee plantation owner
 Elizabeth Jens (born 1984), Australian NASA propulsion engineer
 Ellen Jens, Dutch television director and producer
 João Jens (born 1944), Brazilian volleyball player
 Salome Jens (born 1935), American actress
 Walter Jens (1923–2013), German philologist, literature historian, critic, university professor and writer

See also
 Jens (given name)
Surnames from given names